Günther Marks (28 November 1897 – 4 March 1978) was a German church musician, organist and composer. He was born in Gollnow, Pomerania, and died in Dahme, Brandenburg.

External links 

 
 Günther Marks – Ein Leben für die Kirchenmusik kirche-wriezen.de (PDF) 

1897 births
1978 deaths
People from Goleniów
People from the Province of Pomerania
German organists
German male organists
20th-century German musicians
20th-century organists
20th-century German male musicians